The  was a field army of the Imperial Japanese Army during the final stages of World War II.

History

The Japanese 13th Area Army was responsible for the Tōkai region of Japan and was headquartered in Nagoya.

It consisted mostly of poorly trained reservists, conscripted students and home guard militia. In addition, the Japanese had organized the Patriotic Citizens Fighting Corps — which included all healthy men aged 15–60 and women 17–40 — to perform combat support, and ultimately combat jobs.  Weapons, training, and uniforms were generally lacking: some men were armed with nothing better than muzzle-loading muskets, longbows, or bamboo spears; nevertheless, they were expected to make do with what they had.

The 13th Area Army was demobilized at the surrender of Japan on August 15, 1945 without having seen combat.

List of Commanders

References

Books

External links

Notes 

13
Military units and formations established in 1945
Military units and formations disestablished in 1945
History articles needing translation from Japanese Wikipedia